In typography,  titling capitals are a variant of uppercase  designed for heading and titles. The stroke width is reduced for use at larger point sizes where the stroke weight used in smaller text sizes would be too heavy.

Titling faces are often made to complement text faces intended for book typesetting. Titling faces have more open counter-forms.

References
Blackwell, Lewis. 20th Century Type. Yale University Press: 2004. .
Jaspert, W. Pincus, W. Turner Berry and A.F. Johnson. The Encyclopædia of Type Faces. Blandford Press Lts.: 1953, 1983. .

Typography
Book design